The rencong (Acehnese: reuncong, Dutch spelling: rentjong, British spelling: renchong) is a type of knife originating in Aceh, Indonesia.  Originally a fighting weapon, it is most often seen today in the martial art of pencak silat and worn during traditional ceremonies.

Description
The rencong is slightly L-shaped and has a sharp blade with a slightly convex back. The blade can vary in length from 10 to 50 cm.  The blade can be straight or cranked like a kris. It is held in a scabbard of wood, ivory, horn, or sometimes even silver or gold. The rencong is worn on one's belt around the waist.

The design of a rencong depends largely on the social status of its owner.  The most common type is made of brass or silver steel with a sheath of wood or buffalo horn.  The rencong used by royalty is more ornate and less functional. Royal rencong have sheathes of ivory and blade made from gold, engraved with Quranic verses.

Technique
Rencong technique is dependent on the weapon's size. Smaller lengths are favoured because they are more easily concealed. The rencong is worn on the left side and drawn with the left foot forward. A quick step forward with the right foot adds momentum to the thrust. It is then whipped to the right with a snap of the hand, bringing the palm upwards while the elbow is close to the body. The thrusting arm is almost fully extended and the palm is turned downward just before piercing the target. While the thrust is the primary method of attack, circular and elliptical slashing techniques exist as well. The main targets are the throat, kidneys, groin, and abdomen.

Culture
Aceh folklore ascribes mystical attributes and supernatural powers to the rencong. The form of the weapon is said to represent the Basmala. The rencong is today worn as part of traditional attire on ceremonial occasions. Aceh is also known as the "Land of the Rencong" (Tanah Rencong).

See also

 Kris
 Peurawot
 Sewar
 Weapons of silat

References

Further reading

External links
 Keris Indonesia: 'The Rencong Dagger'

Daggers
Weapons of Indonesia
Culture of Aceh